The PGL Major Stockholm 2021, also known as PGL Major 2021 or Stockholm 2021, was the sixteenth Counter-Strike: Global Offensive (CS:GO) Major Championship. It was held in Stockholm, Sweden at the Avicii Arena from October 26 to November 7, 2021. Twenty-four teams qualified via regional major rankings. It was the second Major hosted by the Romanian organization PGL, after PGL Major: Kraków 2017. Stockholm 2021 was the first Major after a break caused by the COVID-19 pandemic following the StarLadder Major: Berlin 2019. The Major was won by Natus Vincere, who did not lose a single map throughout the tournament.

Background 
Counter-Strike: Global Offensive is a multiplayer first-person shooter video game developed by Hidden Path Entertainment and Valve Corporation. It is the fourth game in the Counter-Strike series. In professional CS:GO, the Valve-sponsored Majors are the most prestigious tournaments.

The Stockholm Major was the first Major in two years following an absence in offline play in 2020 and 2021 due to the COVID-19 pandemic. Previously, the ESL One Rio Major 2020 was planned for May 2020, but was postponed to November, before later being canceled in September.

The defending champions were Astralis, who won their fourth Major at Berlin 2019. They were eliminated in the Legends stage after their loss to Team Vitality.

Format

Map Pool 
Between the Berlin 2019 Major and the Stockholm 2021 Major, Valve replaced Train in the active duty map pool with Ancient.

Regional Major Ranking 
On April 2, 2020, Valve revised the former major qualification system which featured direct qualifiers called minors, for a yearly circuit where teams had to earn Regional Major Ranking Points (RMR) in a series of tournaments. The system was revised in scope of the first postponement of the Rio Major. In early January 2021, Valve reached out to organizers for proposals of three RMR events per region–Asia, CIS, Europe, North America, South America and Oceania. Five days later, the corporation released the 2020 RMR Sticker capsule as an in-game item, including the team's logos as sticker who qualified for Rio. They furthermore reset all the points acquired and reset the leaderboard. As a compensation, teams who qualified as a Legend for the Rio Major were awarded with 600 points, Challengers with 300 and Contenders with 100. Through the rules laid out by Valve, teams were able to replace up to two members of their roster at a time for a penalty. Teams lost 20% of their points per player change. If three or more players were removed from the team, the points would be reset. At least two RMR events per region were required with an optional third one being possible. The only regions to have three RMR events were CIS and South America.

Tournaments

RMR standings

Teams competing 

Legends

 Evil Geniuses
 FURIA Esports
 G2 Esports
 Gambit Esports
 Natus Vincere
 Ninjas in Pyjamas
 Team Liquid
 Team Vitality

 Challengers

 Astralis
 BIG
 ENCE
 Heroic
 MOUZ
 Movistar Riders
 paiN Gaming
 Team Spirit

 Contenders

 Copenhagen Flames
 Entropiq
 FaZe Clan
 GODSENT
 Renegades
 Sharks Esports
 TYLOO
 Virtus.pro

New Challengers Stage 

The New Challengers stage took place from October 26 to October 29, 2021, at the Avicii Arena. The Challengers stage, also known as the Preliminary stage and formerly known as the offline qualifier, is a sixteen team swiss tournament. Initial seeding was determined using RMR srandings, from the 3rd round forward the Buchholz system was used.

New Legends Stage 

 Top 8 Teams proceed to New Champions Stage
 Bottom 8 Teams are eliminated

{| class="wikitable" style="text-align: center;"
|-
! width="20px"  | Place
! width="400px" | Team
! width="50px"  | Record
! width="30px"  | RD
! width="260px" | Round 1
! width="260px" | Round 2
! width="260px" | Round 3
! width="260px" | Round 4
! width="260px" | Round 5
|-
| rowspan="2"| 
| Natus Vincere 
| 3-0
| +31
| 
| 
| 
| 
| 
|-
| G2 Esports 
| 3-0
| +24
| 
| 
| 
| 
| 
|-
| rowspan="3"| 
| Heroic
| 3-1
| +22
| 
| 
| 
| 
| 
|-
| Gambit Esports
| 3-1
| +17
| 
| 
| 
| 
| 
|-
| FURIA Esports
| 3-1
| +3
| 
| 
| 
| 
| 
|-
| rowspan="3"| 
| Team Vitality 
| 3-2
| +23
| 
| 
| 
| 
| 
|-
| Virtus.pro 
| 3-2
| +2
| 
| 
| 
| 
| 
|-
| Ninjas in Pyjamas
| 3-2
| -9
| 
| 
| 
| 
| 
|-
| rowspan="3"| 
| Copenhagen Flames
| 2-3
| 6
| 
| 
| 
| 
| 
|-
| FaZe Clan
| 2-3
| -2
| 
| 
| 
| 
| 
|-
| Entropiq
| 2-3
| -12
| 
| 
| {{winDL|res=L|High match'G2 Esports0-2}}
| 
| 
|-
| rowspan="3"| 
| MOUZ
| 1-3
| -5
| 
| 
| 
| 
| 
|-
| Team Liquid
| 1-3
| -17
| 
| 
| 
| 
| 
|-
| Astralis 
| 1-3
| -25
| 
| 
| 
| 
| 
|-
| rowspan="2"| 
| ENCE
| 0-3
| -33
| 
| 
| 
| 
| 
|-
| Evil Geniuses 
| 0-3
| -36
| 
| 
| 
| 
| 
|}

 New Champions Stage 
With eight teams remaining, the final stage of the Major is a single-elimination bracket, with all matches played as best-of-3 maps. 

Bracket

Quarterfinals

Heroic vs. Virtus.proCasters: Semmler & mosesG2 Esports vs. Ninjas in PyjamasCasters: Semmler & AndersFURIA Esports vs. Gambit EsportsCasters: James Bardolph & ddkNatus Vincere vs. Team VitalityCasters: James Bardolph & ddkSemifinals

Heroic vs. G2 EsportsCasters: Semmler & AndersNatus Vincere vs. Gambit EsportsCasters: Semmler & MosesFinals

Natus Vincere vs. G2 EsportsCasters: Machine & SPUNJ

Final standings
The final placings are shown below. In addition, the prize distribution, seed for the next major, roster, and coaches are shown.

Notes

References 

2021 first-person shooter tournaments
Counter-Strike: Global Offensive Majors